Far Away is the second album of the Belgian trio Lasgo. It features the singles "Surrender", "All Night Long", "Who's That Girl" and "Lying'". The album is Evi Goffin's last contribution as the vocalist for Lasgo.  The song "Tonight" is not to be confused with their 2010 single "Tonight", a different song and music video, featuring replacement vocalist Jelle Van Dael.

Track listing
Surrender
All Night Long
Deep In Your Heart
Only You
Still
True
Who's That Girl
Yesterday
Far Away
Lying
Tell Me
Tonight
Hold Me Now

References

2005 albums
Lasgo albums